Santa Catalina may refer to:

Catalina Thomás (1533–1574), Spanish saint and patron saint of Mallorca

Places

Argentina
 Santa Catalina Department, a department of Argentina
Santa Catalina, Jujuy, capital of the department
Santa Catalina, Córdoba, a settlement in Río Cuarto Department

Colombia
Archipelago of San Andrés, Providencia and Santa Catalina
Providencia and Santa Catalina Islands, a municipality
Santa Catalina Island (Colombia)
Santa Catalina, Bolívar

Dominican Republic
Catalina Island (Dominican Republic), south of La Romana

Guatemala
Santa Catalina la Tinta, Alta Verapaz

Mexico
Isla Santa Catalina, Gulf of California, Baja California Sur
Santa Catalina Quieri, Oaxaca

Panama
Santa Catalina, Panama, Pacific coast of Veraguas

Peru
Santa Catalina de Mossa District, Morropon Province, Piura
Santa Catalina District, Luya Province, Amazonas
Santa Catalina, Lima, a neighborhood in La Victoria District, Lima
Santa Catalina Monastery
Fort of Santa Catalina, Lima, a colonial fort in Lima

Philippines
Santa Catalina, Ilocos Sur
Santa Catalina, Negros Oriental
Santa Catalina, San Pablo City

Spain
Castle of Santa Catalina (Cádiz)
Castle of Santa Catalina (Jaén)
Isla de Santa Catalina, off the Península de Almina in Ceuta
Botanical Garden of Santa Catalina, Trespuentes, Álava province, Basque Country
Santa Catalina, Valencia, a church in Valencia
University of Santa Catalina in El Burgo de Osma, Castilla and Leon

United States
Gulf of Santa Catalina
Santa Catalina Island (California)
Santa Catalina Mountains, north of Tucson, Arizona
Santa Catalina School, Monterey, California
Santa Catalina Palace, also known as La Fortaleza, San Juan, Puerto Rico
Santa Catalina de Guale, a Spanish Franciscan mission and town in Spanish Florida from 1602 to 1702

Others
Santa Catalina (Solomon Islands), an island
Santa Catalina, Uruguay

Other uses
"26 Miles (Santa Catalina)", a 1958 song by The Four Preps
SS Santa Catalina

See also
Santa Catarina (disambiguation)
St. Catherine (disambiguation)